Lema was a "blue plan" front-company of the Civil Cooperation Bureau established in Johannesburg, South Africa with offices in Parktown by ex-policeman Leon André Maree. The company's name was derived from the first two letters of its founder's name and surname. It exported electronic appliances, computers, pocket calculators, and watches from South Africa to other African countries.

Lema was funded with at least R40 000 by the South African Defence Force.

Other SADF front organizations 
 Civil Cooperation Bureau
 Delta G Scientific Company
 Executive Outcomes
 Jeugkrag
 Roodeplaat Research Laboratories
 Veterans for Victory

See also
Politics of South Africa

References

Companies based in Johannesburg